Rignano may refer to:

Places in Italy
Rignano Flaminio, a municipality in the Province of Rome, Lazio
Rignano Garganico, a municipality in the Province of Foggia, Apulia
Rignano sull'Arno, a municipality in the Province of Florence, Tuscany

People with the surname
Eugenio Rignano (1870–1930), Italian philosopher

Other uses
Battle of Rignano, an 1137 battle involving Normans and the Kingdom of Sicily near Rignano Garganico

See also
Orignano, a civil parish of Baronissi (SA), Campania